Estakhr is an ancient city in Fars Province, Iran.

Estakhr may also refer to:
 Estakhr, Fars
 Estakhr-e Pahn, Isfahan Province
 Estakhr, Kerman
 Estakhr, Razavi Khorasan
 Estakhr, Sistan and Baluchestan
 Estakhr, South Khorasan
 Estakhr-e Deraz, South Khorasan